Abia Warriors Football Club is a Nigerian professional football club based in the city of Umuahia, Abia state.

Between 2005 and 2010, they played under the name "Orji Uzor Kalu FC" in honor of Abia governor Orji Uzor Kalu who helped the club with state sponsorship upon promotion to the professional level. They reverted to their old name in summer of 2010.

They won promotion to the Nigeria Premier League for the first time in August 2013 after winning their division on the last day.

Current squad

Notable players
 Raimi Kola (2015–2017)

References

External links
2005 Division 1 table

 
Association football clubs established in 2003
Football clubs in Nigeria
Abia State
2003 establishments in Nigeria
Sports clubs in Nigeria